Anne Frater (b. 1967) is a Scottish poet. She was born in Stornoway (Steòrnabhagh), in Lewis on the Western Isles (na h-Eileanan Siar). She was brought up in the village of Upper Bayble (Pabail Uarach) in the district of Point, a small community which has also been home to Derick Thomson and Iain Crichton Smith (Iain Mac a'Ghobhainn).

Style 
Her poetry makes an in-depth analysis of identity and nation as well as love, landscape and language. She mainly writes in free verse.

Early life 
Frater graduated from the University of Glasgow with a first class honours degree in Celtic and French. She received a teaching qualification from Jordanhill College of Education (now part of the University of Strathclyde). In 1995, she was awarded a PhD from the University of Glasgow for her thesis on Scottish Gaelic women's poetry up to 1750. She lectures at Lews Castle College in Stornoway (UHI, University of the Highlands and Islands/Oilthigh na Gàidhealtachd agus nan Eilean), where she teaches on the Gaelic-medium degree courses, and is Programme Leader for the BAH Gaelic Scotland.

Bibliography 
Her poems are included in anthologies of Scottish Gaelic poetry: Whyte 1991a, Kerrigan 1991, Stephen 1993, O'Rourke 1994, Crowe 1997, Black 1999, McMillan and Byrne 2005 and MacNeil 2011. She published in magazines such as Chapman and Verse.  Her first anthology, 'Fo'n t-Slige' (Under the Shell) was published in 1995, and her second collection, 'Cridhe Creige' in 2017.

In March 2016, a selection of ten poems, Anns a’ Chànan Chùbhraidh/En la lengua fragante was premiered by her and Miguel Teruel, a translator, in a public reading at the University of Valencia, Spain. The poems were read in Scottish Gaelic by the poet and the Spanish version by Teruel's translation.

References

1967 births
Living people
People from Stornoway
Scottish women poets
Scottish Gaelic women poets
Scottish Gaelic poets
21st-century Scottish Gaelic poets